Hermann Langbein (18 May 1912 – 24 October 1995) was an Austrian communist resistance fighter and historian.

He fought in the Spanish Civil War with the International Brigades for the Spanish Republicans against the Nationalists under Francisco Franco, and was in active opposition to the German Nazi regime. He was a concentration camp prisoner and co-founder of the International Auschwitz Committee in 1954.

Life
Hermann Langbein worked as an actor after graduating from the German People's Theatre. In 1933 he joined the KPÖ, and fled the country after the Anschluss to fight in the Spanish Civil War for the International Brigades against the establishment of a dictatorship under Franco. 
He was interned in France after the end of the Spanish Civil War, and then sent to German concentration camps after the fall of France in 1940. Over the next few years he was imprisoned in several different camps (Dachau, Auschwitz and others).
Interned in Auschwitz in 1942, Langbein was classified as a non-Jewish political prisoner and he was assigned as clerk to the infirmary, which gave him access to documentation and first-hand knowledge about the medical mistreatment, torture and killings of other camp prisoners - Langbein later used his knowledge to help establish the International Auschwitz Committee and trials at which he testified. His prisoner number in the camp was 60355. In August 1944 Langbein was transferred to the Neuengamme concentration camp and from there to the Neuengamme subcamp Lerbeck near Minden. On the evacuation transport to Fallersleben east of Hannover, he jumped off the train in mid-April 1945 and fled to Austria by bike on 5 May, where he arrived in his hometown of Vienna in May 1945. He was among the leadership of the International Resistance groups in the camps he was held in. After 1945 he was General Secretary of the International Auschwitz Committee, and later Secretary of the "Comité International des Camps".

Post war
Initially, Langbein was a full-time work at the KPÖ and a member of the Party Central Committee. He was involved in the construction of party schools and published his 1947 written-down camp experiences from Auschwitz and other camps under the title The Fittest in 1949 from his own publishing house. In the early 1950s Langbein failed to be re-elected to the Central Committee. After conflicts with the party, Langbein moved to Budapest, where he edited German-language radio broadcasts in Hungarian broadcasting. He returned to Austria in 1954 with his wife and daughter.
Langbein was co-founder of the International Auschwitz Committee (IAC) in 1954, and became its first secretary general. From 1955 to the early 1960s Langbein was secretary of the Austrian Camp Community Auschwitz. In these functions, Langbein brought the concentration camp crimes to public notice and fought for compensation for former concentration camp victims. He was excluded from KPÖ in 1958 when he started—in the wake of the Hungarian Uprising of 1956—to challenge Stalinism. Alienated from the KPÖ, Langbein 1960 was relieved of his post as general secretary of the IAC and excluded the following year also from its management. In 1963 Langbein was Secretary of the "Comité International des Camps".
On 18 October 1961, the West German Radio broadcast a three-hour feature about Auschwitz conceived by Langbein and H. G. Adler: Topography of an extermination camp.
In the mid-1960s, Langbein, along with Fritz Bauer, played an essential part in bringing about the Frankfurt Auschwitz trials where he appeared as a witness. He then worked as a writer and journalist. In 1967 he was awarded by Yad Vashem as Righteous Among the Nations.
From 1989 to 1995 he organized together with Johannes Schwantner the seminar "ideology and reality of National Socialism" for Educators. Moreover, Langbein belonged to the Museum Council of Auschwitz-Birkenau and worked on the redesign of the exhibition. Since 1996, a memorial conference called "Hermann Langbein Symposium" takes place every year in Linz. 
The author and writer Kurt Langbein is his son, the actor Daniel Langbein his grandson.

Works
He wrote several books about his experiences in the camps. The most important and influential is:

 People in Auschwitz. Translated by Henry Friedlander. University of North Carolina Press, 2003, .
Also:
 Die Stärkeren. Ein Bericht. Stern-Verlag, Wien 1949, .

References

External links 
 In Memoriam Prof. Hermann Langbein-German
 Hermann Langbein at Yad Vashem website

Austrian communists
Austrian people of the Spanish Civil War
Austrian expatriates in Spain
Austrian Righteous Among the Nations
People from Vienna
Dachau concentration camp survivors
Auschwitz concentration camp survivors
1912 births
1995 deaths
International Brigades personnel
International Auschwitz Committee members